The following is a list of municipal presidents of Tuxtla Gutiérrez, in Chiapas state, Mexico.

List of officials

 Noé Vázquez Rincón, 1915 
 Emilio Araujo, 1916 
 Enoch Araujo, 1917 
 José María Cabrera, 1918 
 Raquel Cal y Mayor, 1919-1920 
 José María Trujillo, 1920 
 Manuel C. Paz, 1921 
 Álvaro Cancino, 1922-1923 
 Enoch C. Araujo, 1924 
 Mario Culebro, 1925 
 César A. Lara, 1926 
 José Videgaray de Gortari, 1927 
 Luis Cuesy, 1928 
 , 1928 
 David Gómez, 1928 
 Eduardo Sánchez Chanona, 1929 
 Abraham Gamboa, 1930 
 Isabel Calvo, 1931-1932 
 Jesús G. Martínez, 1931-1932 
 Gustavo López Gutiérrez, 1933-1934 
 Celso Selvas, 1935-1936 
 Jesús Gamboa, 1937-1938 
 Salvador Morales, 1939-1940 
 Fidel Martínez, 1941-1942 
 Gustavo López Solís, 1943-1944 
 Joaquín González, 1943-1944 
 Tomás Martínez, 1945-1946 
 David Gómez Hijo, 1947-1948 
 Manuel T. Coutiño, 1949-1950 
 , 1951-1952 
 Jesús Cancino Casahonda, 1951-1952 
 José Esquinca Aguilar, 1953-1955 
 Álvaro Raquel Mendoza, 1956-1958 
 Héctor Yáñez Estrada, 1959-1961 
 Esteban Corzo Blanco, 1962-1964 
 Oscar Marín Zambrano, 1964
 Manuel Ángel Borges Jiménez, 1965-1967 
 Romeo Rincón Castillejos, 1968-1970 
 Humberto Farrera Llavén, 1970
 Jesús Cancino Casahonda, 1971-1973 
 José Ricardo Borges Espinosa, 1974-1976 
 Valdemar Antonio Rojas López, 1977-1979 
 Ariosto Olivia Ruíz, 1980-1982 
 Ricardo Solís Trujillo, 1981-1982
 Noé Farrera Llavén, 1982
 Noé Camacho Camacho, 1983-1985 
 José María López Sánchez, 1986-1988 
 , 1989 
 Enrique Esquinca Méndez, 1989-1991 
 Julio César García Cáceres, 1992-1995 
 Federico Luis Salazar Narváez, 1995
 Enoch Araujo Sánchez, 1996-1998 
 Francisco Rojas Toledo, 1999-2001 
 Victoria Rincón Carrillo, 2002-2004 
 Juan Sabines Guerrero, 2005-2006 
 María del Rosario Pariente Gavito, 2006-2007
 , 2008-2010 
 Flor de María Coello Trejo, 2010
 , 2010-2012 
 Felipe de Jesús Granda Pastrana, 2012
 , 2012-2015 
 , 2015-2018 
 Carlos Molano Robles, 2018
 Carlos Morales Vázquez, 2018-2021

See also

References

Tuxtla Gutiérrez
Politicians from Chiapas
People from Tuxtla Gutiérrez
History of Chiapas